The 1921 Talladega football team was an American football team that represented the Talladega College during the 1921 college football season. In its second season under head coach Jubie Bragg, the team compiled a – record. Talladega was recognized as the 1921 black college national co-champion.

In November 1921, The Birmingham News reported that Talladega's quarterback "Skeats" Gordon was "reputed to have been showing dazzling ability all this year." Other players on the 1920 Talladega team included fullback Edwards from Anniston, halfback Spencer from Edgewater, and halfback Webber from King's Mountain, North Carolina. 

Talladega College was and remains a historically black college located in Talladega, Alabama. Due to segregation, Talladega and other historically black colleges and universities played games among themselves. In 1920, the Pittsburgh Courier, an African-American weekly newspaper, began selecting national champions from the black college football teams.  The Courier selected Talladega as the co-champion in both 1920 and 1921.

Schedule

References

Talladega
Talladega Tornadoes football seasons
Black college football national champions
College football undefeated seasons
Talladega football